Syllepte lanatalis is a moth in the family Crambidae. It was described by Viette in 1960. It is found in Madagascar.

It's got a wingspan of 31-34mm.

References

Moths described in 1960
lanatalis
Moths of Madagascar